Tetrathiafulvalene (TTF) is an organosulfur compound with the formula (. Studies on this heterocyclic compound contributed to the development of molecular electronics. TTF is related to the hydrocarbon fulvalene, by replacement of four CH groups with sulfur atoms.  Over 10,000 scientific publications discuss TTF and its derivatives.

Preparation
The high level of interest in TTFs has spawned the development of many syntheses of TTF and its analogues.  Most preparations entail the coupling of cyclic  building blocks such as 1,3-dithiole-2-thion or the related 1,3-dithiole-2-ones.  For TTF itself, the synthesis begins with the trithiocarbonate , which is S-methylated and then reduced to give , which is treated as follows:

H2C2S2CH(SCH3) + HBF4 -> [H2C2S2CH+]BF4- + HSCH3

2 [H2C2S2CH+]BF4- + 2 Et3N -> (H2C2S2C)2 + 2 Et3NHBF4

Redox properties
Bulk TTF itself has unremarkable electrical properties. Distinctive properties are, however, associated with salts of its oxidized derivatives, such as salts derived from TTF+.

The high electrical conductivity of TTF salts can be attributed to the following features of TTF:  (i) its planarity, which allows π-π stacking of its oxidized derivatives, (ii) its high symmetry, which promotes charge delocalization, thereby minimizing coulombic repulsions, and (iii) its ability to undergo oxidation at mild potentials to give a stable radical cation. Electrochemical measurements show that TTF can be oxidized twice reversibly:

TTF -> TTF+ + e-

TTF+ -> TTF^2+ + e- 

Each dithiolylidene ring in TTF has 7π electrons: 2 for each sulfur atom, 1 for each sp2 carbon atom.  Thus, oxidation converts each ring to an aromatic 6π-electron configuration, consequently leaving the central double bond essentially a single bond, as all π-electrons occupy ring orbitals.

History

The salt  was reported to be a semiconductor in 1972.  Subsequently, the charge-transfer salt [TTF]TCNQ was shown to be a narrow band gap semiconductor.  X-ray diffraction studies of [TTF][TCNQ] revealed stacks of partially oxidized TTF molecules adjacent to anionic stacks of TCNQ molecules.  This "segregated stack" motif was unexpected and is responsible for the distinctive electrical properties, i.e. high and anisotropic electrical conductivity.  Since these early discoveries, numerous analogues of TTF have been prepared.  Well studied analogues include tetramethyltetrathiafulvalene (Me4TTF), tetramethylselenafulvalenes (TMTSFs), and bis(ethylenedithio)tetrathiafulvalene  (BEDT-TTF, CAS [66946-48-3]). Several tetramethyltetrathiafulvalene salts (called Fabre salts) are of some relevance as organic superconductors.

See also
 Bechgaard salt

References

Further reading
 
 
 
 
 Physical properties of Tetrathiafulvalene from the literature.

Molecular electronics
Organic semiconductors
Dithioles